is a 2020 erotic role-playing video game developed by Alicesoft. The game deals with serious subjects such as abuse and prostitution, and been praised for its characterization, themes, and dystopian setting, as well as its visual design.

The original Japanese version released on November 27, 2020.  A Simplified Chinese version was released on March 26, 2021, and an English version by Shiravune followed on October 29, 2021.  In Japan, Dohna Dohna went on to win industry awards.

To commemorate its release, music content from Dohna Dohna was added to rhythm-run action game Muse Dash globally in December 2020.

Story 
The game takes place in Asougi City, a fictional provincial-town facing the Seto Inland Sea that has been completely taken over by the "Asougi Group," a monolithic corporation that controls every aspect of its citizens lives.

However, Asougi frequently disappears citizens for arbitrary offenses, especially failing to uphold their rigorous propaganda, sentencing them to what they euphemistically call "Temp Work." The oppressive nature of the regime has given rise to some level of bubbling unrest, manifesting itself in the form of the "Anti-Aso" clans, groups of rebels who fight back against Asougi through armed robbery and the selling of women for profit.

As the Founder's Birthday Ceremony approaches, Asougi's grip on the population tightens, and the Anti-Aso agitate. Meanwhile, the general public turns a blind-eye to goings-on in the city.

Players take control of the Anti-Aso clan Nayuta, and through the game's mechanics, control both their business and battle operations as they strive to outcompete the other clans on the ground and ultimately topple Asougi itself.

Characters 

Kuma, the protagonist, is Nayuta's second in command and frequently delegated to the most troublesome and unsavory duties. Though more hardworking and serious than the other members, Kuma seems to be rather popular. His parents were killed by Asougi, and he was chosen to be used as the next "Body Donor." However, his sister, Amane Nagara, saved him by taking his place, leaving her presumed dead. To exact his sworn revenge on Asougi, he joined the Anti-Aso clan, Nayuta.

As Nayuta's founder, Zappa is reckless, boisterous, and always seeking out ways to have fun. His real name is Kazutaka Yamamoto, youngest son of the Asougi founding family. Disgusted with their corrupt regime, he decided to leave and found Nayuta to resist.

Porno was a victim of a nefarious organization called "Reach" before she was rescued by Kuma, and Nayuta took her in. Porno sees herself as Kuma's superior, and claims to have sex with him to "improve his skills." She often pulls other sexual pranks.

Kirakira is a pink-haired student with an easygoing personality who joined Nayuta to escape the "boredom" of average life. She's a fashionista, and made Nayuta's combat outfits herself. When the conflict turns lethal, she feels too scared to go on, but Kuma helps her find reason to keep fighting. Her real name in the English version is Macaron Shinomiya

Torataro is a runaway and dropout who co-founded Nayuta with Zappa. As a skilled mechanic, he made all of his weapons himself. Kuma is his rival, and Torataro squabbles with him over who is Nayuta's number-two. He also dislikes the nickname "Torataro" and wants to drop it.

A short, blonde woman with a childish and innocent personality, ALyCE is a lethal sniper. She and her twin sister, YAMMy, were initially mercenaries sold to Flattt, but after they are defeated, she joins Nayuta for protection.
Her appearance is modeled after Alice-chan, AliceSoft's mascot character.

Medico is a nursing student from Nara who is unaware of the dystopian state of Asougi city. She is searching for her father, a journalist who came to investigate and went missing. Nayuta saves her from an arbitrary arrest, and when she helps them in turn by treating an injury Torataro sustains, they recognize her as a member.

Kirakira's best friend and classmate, but she never shows up to school. Her real name is Eria Arecibo-Kouda. She is a genius electrical engineer, and has a fascination with radio waves.  As Nayuta's hacker, she is in charge of intelligence, security, and lock-breaking. She claims to be driven by intellectual curiosity, and others find her 'weird' due to her social ineptitude.

The head of the Shinonome clan and honors student at an all-girl's school, she inherits her family's mission to take down the Asougi authorities. Kikuchiyo specializes in using her katana as a fighter and is not involved in the most criminal operations of the Shinonome Clan. After fighting alongside Kuma to resolve an incident, she develops feelings for him. Feeling that this is distracting her, her second-in-command, Shinazu, and her clan abandon her and change leadership. With nowhere to turn, she makes friends with Nayuta, and joins them instead.

Joker is a young man with a slight and feminine build. Nayuta saves him from his fate of human experimentation as a "Body Donor," so he helps them to repay them for their kindness, at least in his view.

Mistress is the owner of the black-market general store for the Anti-Aso called VILE/VAN. She's an arms dealer with connections, and she organizes the Clans with high-paying clients. In reality, she is Hisamitsu's secretary, and her real surname is Izumi.

Chairman of Asougi Heavy Industries, involved in their robotics program, and a central antagonist. His full name is Hisamitsu Yamamoto, and he is really Zappa's cousin.

Development and release 
Dohna Dohna was developed by AliceSoft. The scenario was written by Dice Korogashi, with character designs and illustrations by Gyokai. Kanikama provided super-deformed illustrations. The opening theme song, was sung by Tsukino.

Prior to launch, AliceSoft released a free trial for download on Fanza Games on November 5, 2020. The package edition, download edition and deluxe edition of Dohna Dohna were released for Windows PCs on November 27, 2020, with compatibility for Windows 8/10. The "Deluxe" edition of the game was bundled with a dakimakura cover, a CD copy of the original soundtrack, and a copy of Haru Urare, a small game considered to be Dohna Dohna'''s spiritual predecessor. Other merchandise such as telephone cards and pin badges were also included as purchase and pre-order bonuses. The English version, translated and published by Shiravune, was released on Johren Games on October 29, 2021.

Reception

On Getchu.com, a redistributor of visual novel and anime products, Dohna Dohna ranked as the second best selling bishōjo game for the month of its release. Deluxe edition of the game also ranked as the eighth best selling bishōjo game at the same period. According to Japanese magazine "BugBug", it was the best selling bishōjo game from November 16, 2020, to December 15, 2020.

Tadamoto Ōsawa, the editor-in-chief of "BugBug", praised Dohna Dohna'' for its visual effects, user interface and illustration. Ryo from Media Clip praised the background music and pop graphics, and wrote that they "make the game fun and cheerful."

Taiwanese publication 4Gamers was pleased with the handling of  characters' flaws and motivations, which "grounded the story in a sense of realism," and praised the depiction of "the disappointing side of human nature." They also noted that there was depth to the "quite responsible" story.

References

External links 
 
Official website (in English)

2020 video games
Bishōjo games
Eroge
Video games developed in Japan
Windows games
Windows-only games
Single-player video games
Japanese role-playing video games